Kristaps Blanks (born 30 January 1986) is a Latvian football coach and former player who played as striker. He is a first-team coach at Riga FC.

References

1986 births
Living people
People from Tukums
Latvian footballers
Latvia international footballers
Skonto FC players
FK Daugava (2003) players
Riga FC players
Association football forwards